Cycling at the 2007 Southeast Asian Games was split into three categories:

Track, held at the Velodrome at His Majesty the King's 80th Birthday Anniversary Stadium (5 December 2007) in Amphoe Mueang Nakhon Ratchasima, Nakhon Ratchasima Province, Thailand.
Road, held on Mittraphap Road (Thailand Route 2), Nakhon Ratchasima Province, Thailand.
Mountain, held at the Khao Yai Thiang, Amphoe Sikhio, Nakhon Ratchasima Province, Thailand.
The cycling schedule began on December 5 to December 13.

Medal table

Medalists

Mountain biking

Road cycling

Track cycling

Men

Women

External links
Southeast Asian Games Official Results

See also
2007 in track cycling

 

2007 Southeast Asian Games events
2007 in cycle racing
2007
Cycle racing in Thailand
2007 in track cycling
2007 in road cycling
2007 in mountain biking